The list of ship commissionings in 1872 includes a chronological list of all ships commissioned in 1872.


References

See also 

1872
 Ship commissionings